Northwest Hancock is an unorganized territory (township) in Hancock County, Maine, United States. The population was 2 at the 2020 census. The territory is designated as Township 32 Middle Division.

Geography
According to the United States Census Bureau, the unorganized territory has a total area of 41.4 square miles (107.3 km2), of which 41.3 square miles (107.1 km2) is land and 0.1 square mile (0.2 km2) is water (0.22%).

Demographics

As of the census of 2000.there were 4 people, 2 households, and 1 family residing in the unorganized territory. The population density was 0.1 people per square mile (0.0/km2). There were 20 housing units at an average density of 0.5/sq mi (0.2/km2). The racial makeup of the unorganized territory was 100.00% White.

There were 2 households, out of which 1 was a married couple living together, and 1 was a non-family. No households were made up of individuals, and none had someone living alone who was 65 years of age or older. The average household size was 2 and the average family size was 2.

All of the inhabitants were 45 to 64 years old. The median age was 50 years. For every 100 females, there were 100 males. For every 100 females age 18 and over there were 100 males.

References

Unorganized territories in Maine
Populated places in Hancock County, Maine